Giulia Rondon (born 16 October 1987 in Pisa) is an Italian professional volleyball player. She plays for Italy women's national volleyball team. She competed in the 2012 Summer Olympics.

References

External links
 
 
 

1987 births
Italian women's volleyball players
Living people
Olympic volleyball players of Italy
Volleyball players at the 2012 Summer Olympics
Sportspeople from Pisa
Mediterranean Games medalists in volleyball
Mediterranean Games gold medalists for Italy
Mediterranean Games bronze medalists for Italy
Competitors at the 2005 Mediterranean Games
Competitors at the 2009 Mediterranean Games